Martarega is a genus of backswimmers in the family Notonectidae. There are about 13 described species in Martarega.

Species
These 13 species belong to the genus Martarega:

 Martarega awa
 Martarega bentoi Truxal, 1949
 Martarega brasiliensis Truxal, 1949
 Martarega chinai Hynes, 1948
 Martarega gonostyla Truxal, 1949
 Martarega guajira
 Martarega lofoides
 Martarega membranacea White, 1879
 Martarega mexicana Truxal, 1949
 Martarega nessimiani Barbosa & Rodrigues
 Martarega nieseri Barbosa, Ribeiro & Nessimian, 2012
 Martarega oriximinaensis Barbosa, Ribeiro & Ferreira Keppler, 2010
 Martarega siolii Barbosa, Nessimian & Takiya

References

Further reading

 

Notonectidae
Nepomorpha genera
Articles created by Qbugbot